Tasneem Motara (born 7 December 1982) is a South African politician who has been the Gauteng MEC (Member of the Executive Council) for Economic Development since 2022 and a member of the Gauteng Provincial Legislature since 2019. She was the MEC for Infrastructure Development and Property Management between May 2019 and October 2022. From May 2014 to May 2019, she represented Gauteng in the National Council of Provinces. She served as the chief whip of the provincial delegation. Motara is a member of the African National Congress.

Early life and education
Motara was born on 7 December 1982, to an Indian father and a Coloured mother, in Benoni, Transvaal Province. After finishing high school, Motara studied for a degree in psychology from the University of South Africa.

Political career
Motara joined the African National Congress Youth League's branch in Benoni in 2000. She has served on the branch executive committees of multiple wards and branches. She currently serves on the ANC's regional executive committee in Ekurhuleni. Motara was also active in the South African Students Congress.

Following the 2014 general election, Motara was elected to represent Gauteng in the National Council of Provinces, the upper house of the South African Parliament. She was appointed chief whip of the provincial delegation. In June 2018, the Parliamentary Monitoring Group published a report on the ages of parliamentarians. In the report, Motara was named the seventh youngest parliamentarian as well as the youngest ANC MP of both houses.

In the 2019 Gauteng provincial election, Motara was elected to the Gauteng Provincial Legislature. She was sworn in as an MPL on 22 May. Premier David Makhura appointed her MEC for Infrastructure Development and Property Management on 29 May. She was sworn in the following day.

On 27 June 2022, Motara was elected as the deputy provincial secretary of the ANC in Gauteng. In October 2022, she became the MEC for Economic Development in the executive council of premier Panyaza Lesufi.

Personal life
In January 2018, Motara announced that she was HIV positive after her former partner threatened to expose her status. She tested positive for COVID-19 on 3 July 2020.

References

External links
Ms Tasneem Motara – People's Assembly

Living people
1982 births
People from Benoni
African National Congress politicians
Politicians from Gauteng
21st-century South African politicians
21st-century South African women politicians
Members of the Gauteng Provincial Legislature
Members of the National Council of Provinces
Women members of the National Council of Provinces
Women members of provincial legislatures of South Africa